The 1978 Winnipeg Blue Bombers finished in 3rd place in the Western Conference with a 9–7 record. They appeared in the Western Semi-Final but lost 38–4 to the Calgary Stampeders.

Roster

Standings

Preseason

Regular season

Playoffs

West Semi-Final

Awards and honors

CFL All-Stars

References

Winnipeg Blue Bombers seasons
1978 Canadian Football League season by team